Tuukka Matias Mäntylä (born 25 May 1981) is a Finnish former professional ice hockey defenceman. He was selected by the Los Angeles Kings in the 5th round (153rd overall) of the 2001 NHL Entry Draft.

Playing career
Mäntylä came through the youth ranks of Tampere Tappara and made his debut in Finland's top-tier Liiga in the course of the 1999–2000 season. He won the Finnish national championship with Tappara in 2003 and subsequently parted ways with the team to take his game to Sweden, where he joined Luleå HF of the Swedish Elite League (SHL). He enjoyed a two-year stint there, before returning to Tappara. After another two years at his hometown team, Mäntylä embarked on a second SHL tenure, playing for Frölunda HC from 2007 to 2009.

On 7 April 2009 he left Frölunda and signed a contract to return to Tappara.

In late October 2009, playing with Tampere Tappara, Mäntylä checked Helsinki IFK defenceman Mikko Kurvinen from behind into the boards, resulting in an injury that kept Kurvinen sidelined for six games. Mäntylä received a match penalty for the hit. In advance of Tappara's next visit to Helsinki on 26 November 2009, the IFK club ran a full-page ad in a Tampere newspaper that read: “Welcome to Helsinki, Tuukka”, and on the evening of the match between the two clubs the SM-liiga head office, which had previously approved the ad, announced it had given IFK a warning for “crossing the line of good taste”. Early in the first period of the 26 November game, with IFK head coach Kari Jalonen watching, IFK defenceman Ilari Melart mugged Mäntylä in the corner and a wrestling match ensued resulting in both players being ejected from the game.

Between the 2011–12 and the 2015–16 season, he split time between Tappara and KHL outfits HC Neftekhimik Nizhnekamsk, Metallurg Novokuznetsk, Amur Khabarovsk and KHL Medvescak Zagreb.

In July 2016, he was one of the first players to ink a deal with newly founded KHL side Kunlun Red Star from China.

Career statistics

Regular season and playoffs

International

References

External links
 

1981 births
Amur Khabarovsk players
Finnish ice hockey defencemen
Frölunda HC players
HC Kunlun Red Star players
Living people
Los Angeles Kings draft picks
Luleå HF players
KHL Medveščak Zagreb players
Metallurg Novokuznetsk players
HC Neftekhimik Nizhnekamsk players
Ice hockey people from Tampere
Tappara players
Finnish expatriate ice hockey players in China